Big Ang is an American reality television series that premiered on VH1 on July 8, 2012, starring Angela "Big Ang" Raiola, who first received television exposure on the second season of the reality television series Mob Wives.

In May 2013, Raiola confirmed during an interview that a second season of the show was being produced, but it was later revealed that the season would be retooled as another spin-off titled Miami Monkey, which premiered on September 8, 2013.

Production

Big Ang is a spinoff of Mob Wives. It premiered July 8, 2012, on VH1.

Raiola confirmed during an interview in May 2013 that a second season of Big Ang was being produced, but it was later revealed that the season would be retooled as another spin-off titled Miami Monkey, which premiered on September 8, 2013.

Cast

Main

Angela "Big Ang" Raiola
Neil Murphy, Big Ang's husband
Anthony "A.J." D'Onofrio, Big Ang's son
Janine, Big Ang's sister
Dominick, Janine's husband
Linda Torres, Big Ang's friend
Lil' Jenn, Big Ang's friend
Lil' Louis, Big Ang's dog

Guests
Drita D'Avanzo
Renee Graziano
Liv Kingston
Sheila Gambino

Episodes

References

2010s American reality television series
2012 American television series debuts
2012 American television series endings
American television spin-offs
English-language television shows
VH1 original programming
Reality television spin-offs
Television shows set in New York City
Television series by The Weinstein Company